The Threatened Species Scientific Committee provides advice to the Australian federal environment minister on the amendment and updating of lists for threatened species, threatened ecological communities, and key threatening processes and the development or adoption of recovery plans and threat abatement plans. It is established under the Environment Protection and Biodiversity Conservation Act 1999. In 2011, Professor Helene Marsh, a conservation biologist of over 30 years experience was appointed Chair of the committee. Her predecessor, Associate Professor Robert J. S. 'Bob' Beeton, vacated the position after holding it for 11 years. The committee has 10 seats, and positions on the committee are paid. As of 2015, the committee is without a chair, and has several vacancies.

Membership 
As of February 8, 2015, the committee members are:
 Ms Judy Backhouse - Victoria
 Professor Stuart Bunn - Queensland
 Professor Peter Harrison - New South Wales
 Professor David Keith - New South Wales
 Dr Sarah Legge - Western Australia
 Dr Sue Mcintyre - ACT / New South Wales
There are vacancies for three additional members and a chairperson.

References

External links 
 Threatened Species Scientific Committee

Commonwealth Government agencies of Australia